Economic secession has been variously defined by sources. In its narrowest sense, it is abstention from the state's economic system, such as by replacing the use of government money with barter, Local Exchange Trading Systems, or commodity money such as gold. Wendell Berry may have coined the term "economic secession" and promoted his own version in his 1991 essay Conservation and Local Economy. John T. Kennedy used the term to refer to all human action that is forbidden by the state and explains economic secession as tax avoidance or refusal to follow regulations as a method to reduce government control.

Samuel Edward Konkin III used the term "counter-economics" to refer to a similar concept.

Economic secession takes government out of the equation in making economic decisions. Trading happens through payment in-kind, cash and barter.

Economic secession is a way for the individuals to withdraw their wealth for both economic and political reasons. If individuals disagree with the use of tax money to fund a political agenda, they use economic secession as a means of privately protesting the control of government in their lives. The opinion that government is too involved in society fuels individuals to withdraw economically and view their withdrawal from the government system as a moral stand.

Tax avoidance and evasion
Economic secession can involve both legal and illegal tax avoidance such as underground business, black markets and offshore connections. There are as many as sixty offshore locations for wealthy investors to hide their money, including locations in the Caribbean, Channel Island, Switzerland and Lichtenstein. Another tactic that is employed is creating a secret identity where a person acts on behalf of the individual or trust. Cheating the system by wiring money through multiple payments below the $10,000 reportable amount is another way to go unnoticed. Some tax evaders take out credit cards with an identity connected to an offshore company. Moving money around by opening a bank account in a location that is not connect to where they trust is registered is another way to stay anonymous.

Because secessionists do not pay taxes they withdraw themselves not only financially, but socially. If you want to be able to enjoy the wealth you shelter, it will be coming visible, and the government will eventually realize your wealth and you will pay taxes. If your money remains hidden, you are successful in your secession, but cannot use it for exchange. The exchange of goods and money creates the flow of energy within an economic system. "In society, initially innovation drives the changes and innovation creates the building blocks which allow the next stages of social and economic development." If individuals or companies decrease their spending on innovation, the energy into the economic system will decline. Economic secession withdraws capital that leads to innovation and economic prosperity in society.

See also
 Agorism
 Alternative currency
 Bitcoin
 Complementary currency
 Digital gold currency
 eCache
 Local currency
 Mutualism (economic theory)
 Ripple monetary system
 Tax avoidance and tax evasion
 Tax resistance
 Underground economy
 Ven (currency)

References

External links
 "Economic Secession" by John T. Kennedy
 "Economic Secession Won’t Succeed" by Gene Callahan
 "Economic Secession: A Rebuttal" by Claire Wolfe
 "Counter-Economics: Our Means" by Samuel Edward Konkin III, chapter three of New Libertarian Manifesto
 Abstract: Wendell Berry's "Conservation and Local Economy"

Anarchist theory
Secession
Tax resistance
Tax avoidance
Separatism in the United States